Smitty's is a casual dining restaurant based in Canada. It was founded by Walter Chan in 1960. The franchise is also referred to as Smitty's Canada Inc. and uses the slogans "All Your Favorites, All Day Long", and "Canada's Family Restaurant". Smitty's gets its name from John William "Smitty" Smith, the founder of a restaurant in Seattle, Washington.

History

Smitty's was founded in 1960 in Calgary, Alberta. The Head Office is still located in Calgary. In April 2018, the company was acquired by Equicapita Investment Corp, a private company buyout fund based in Calgary.

Products
 Smitty's makes its own pancake mix, waffle mix, pancake syrup, and a special blend of ground coffee that can be purchased at their locations.

Promotions
 Smitty's Family Restaurants has a loyalty program for all of its guests across Canada called MySmitty's Rewards.
 In 2020, to celebrate 60 years of being Canada's Family Restaurant, Smitty's offered a scratch-to-win contest featuring over $1 million in prizes.

See also
List of Canadian restaurant chains

References 

Companies based in Calgary
Restaurants established in 1960
Restaurant chains in Canada